The 2019 Dally M Awards were presented on Wednesday 2 October 2019. They are the official annual awards of the National Rugby League and are named after Dally Messenger.

Dally M Medal
Dally M Player of the Year:  James Tedesco

Dally M Awards
The Dally M Awards are, as usual, conducted at the close of the regular season and hence do not take games played in the finals series into account. 
The Dally M Medal is for the official player of the year, while in a change from previous seasons, the Provan-Summons Medal was awarded to Canterbury-Bankstown Bulldogs skipper Josh Jackson for the sportsmanship he showed in consoling Wests Tigers goalkicker Paul Momirovski after he missed a goal to force golden point against the Bulldogs in round 21.

Team of the Year

Judging Panel 
 Greg Alexander (Fox League)
 Braith Anasta (Fox League)
 Gary Belcher (Fox League)
 Danny Buderus (Fox League)
 Matt Elliott
 Michael Ennis (Fox League)
 Brett Finch (Fox League)
 Mark Geyer (Triple M)
 Ryan Girdler (Triple M)
 Dene Halatau (ABC)
 Justin Hodges (Fox League)
 Andrew Johns (Nine)
 Dallas Johnson
 Brett Kimmorley (Fox League)
 Wally Lewis (Nine)
 Darren Lockyer (Nine)
 Billy Moore (Fox League)
 Corey Parker (Fox League)
 Steve Roach (Fox League)
 Andrew Ryan (ABC)
 Jimmy Smith
 Alan Tongue (ABC)

See also
Dally M Awards
Dally M Medal
2019 NRL season

References

Dally M Awards
Dally M Awards
2019 awards